Toby King (born 2 January 2002) is an English professional footballer who plays as a midfielder for Icelandic club Vestri.

Club career
A student of Felsted School and a youth product of West Ham United, King joined the youth academy of West Bromwich Albion in 2018. He signed his first professional contract with the club on 19 May 2020. He made his debut for the club on 25 August 2021, starting in a 6–0 EFL Cup second round defeat to Arsenal. In November 2021, he joined National League South side Billericay Town on loan. In May 2022, King joined Icelandic 1. deild side Vestri on a permanent deal.

Career statistics

References

External links

West Brom Profile

2002 births
Living people
Association football midfielders
English footballers
West Bromwich Albion F.C. players
Billericay Town F.C. players
Vestri (football club) players
National League (English football) players
1. deild karla players
English expatriate footballers
Expatriate footballers in Iceland
English expatriate sportspeople in Iceland
People educated at Felsted School